Ipidia binotata is a species of beetles from sap beetle family, that can be found in Russia, Sweden, and Spain.

Description
The body is brownish-black, and shining. The elytron have two red spots. Antenna and legs are red as well.

Ecology
They live in forests and forest steppes. The larvae feed on bark conifers.

References

Nitidulidae
Beetles of Europe
Beetles described in 1875